Brightwell Barrow is a Bronze Age round barrow in the civil parish of Brightwell-cum-Sotwell in the English county of Oxfordshire (formerly Berkshire).

It lies just under a kilometre from Wittenham Clumps. Its position is marked by a small clump of trees on its peak. Brightwell Barrow is mentioned in the Domesday Book under the entry for Brightwell-cum-Sotwell.

References

History of Berkshire
History of Oxfordshire
Barrows in the United Kingdom